Prabhu Ganesan (born 25 December 1956), known professionally as Prabhu, is an Indian actor, businessman and film producer who predominantly works in Tamil cinema. He is the son of veteran actor Sivaji Ganesan. He is popularly known as Ilaya Thilagam. He has worked in more than 215 films in lead and supporting roles in Tamil, Telugu, Malayalam and Kannada films.

After making his debut in Sangili (1982), Prabhu played various leading and supporting roles, earning the Best Actor award recognition by the Tamil Nadu State for his portrayal in Chinna Thambi (1991).

Early life
Prabhu was born to veteran actor Sivaji Ganesan and Kamala on 25 December 1956. His elder brother Ramkumar is a film producer and he has two sisters Shanthi and Thenmozhi.

Career
After leaving Bishop Cotton Boys' School in Bangalore, Prabhu got involved in film production as an executive producer and worked alongside his uncle and mentor V. C. Shanmugam, who insisted that Prabhu learn the film making process in a disciplined way, giving him general tasks such as pulling up chairs for artistes. Prabhu's father, actor Sivaji Ganesan, had initially expressed reluctance in allowing Prabhu to pursue an acting career, but through his work in the industry, he began to receive offers from film-makers to feature in their films.

He subsequently made his acting debut in C. V. Rajendran's Sangili (1982), a remake of the Hindi film Kalicharan, where he was cast in a supporting role. By the time Sangili released, Prabhu was working on six films, including Charuhasan's Pudhiya Sangamam and Gangai Amaren's romantic film Kozhi Koovuthu, which became his first commercially successful venture. After featuring in about thirty films, including nineteen with his father including Neethibathi (1983), Sandhippu (1983) and Miruthanga Chakravarthi (1983), Prabhu's career graph registered a drop and he began to reconsider the type of films he had signed. He opted against featuring in films co-starring his father and consciously began to choose subjects rather than accept as many offers as possible.

Among the first films he signed after taking the break included G. M. Kumar's Aruvadai Naal (1986) and Manivannan's Paalaivana Rojakkal, alongside Sathyaraj, both proving successful. Subsequently, the following period saw a series of commercial successes in 1988 for the actor, notably S. P. Muthuraman's Guru Sishyan with Rajinikanth, Mani Ratnam's Agni Natchathiram with Karthik and P. Vasu's family drama En Thangachi Padichava. The success of the latter film prompted more successful collaborations in the same genre between Prabhu and Vasu with Chinna Thambi (1991) and Senthamizh Pattu (1992) also receiving a similar reception, with the actor earning the Best Actor award recognition by the Tamil Nadu state.

He subsequently worked in his hundredth film R. V. Udayakumar's Rajakumaran, before portraying well received roles in K. Balachander's romantic film Duet (1994) and Priyadarshan's Malayalam period film Kaalapani (1996) alongside Mohanlal. Prabhu went through another barren spell in the late 1990s, when several films after the success of Panchalankurichi failed to do well, prompting another image change away from his village do-gooder roles. Moving away from action films, Prabhu selected scripts which would appeal to family audiences in the early 2000s and collaborated with film-makers including Rama Narayanan and T. P. Gajendran, working in a series of "minimum guarantee" return films.

Prabhu then made another career change and began accepting film offers in which he would play a supporting rather than the leading role and featured alongside Kamal Haasan and then Rajinikanth in two big budget ventures Vasool Raja MBBS (2004) and his home production Chandramukhi (2005). Since then, he has gained acclaim portraying characters including a caring guardian in Unakkum Enakkum, Thaamirabharani and Ayan, while he has also been seen in detective roles in action films, notably  Billa (2007) and then Kanthaswamy (2009). He has also played other acclaimed supporting roles in Mani Ratnam's Raavanan (2010) and Aishwarya Dhanush's 3 (2012), while he has ventured into playing similar roles in Telugu, Kannada and Malayalam films. In 2016, Prabhu featured in his 200th film, the romantic comedy Meen Kuzhambum Mann Paanaiyum produced by his nephew, Dushyanth Ramkumar.

The director Sakthi Chidambaram has attempted a sequel Charlie Chaplin 2 (2019) sixteen years later which has nothing in common with the original including comedy excepting for the two male leads.

Personal life
Prabhu is married to Punitha in 1982 and has two children Aishwarya Prabhu (born 1984) and Vikram Prabhu (born 1986), who is also an actor made his acting debut in the 2012 film Kumki.

While still married to Punitha, Prabhu had a live-in relationship with actress Khushbu, and got married on September 12, 1993. The pair subsequently decided to split four months later.

Filmography

Awards

Cinema Express Awards

Filmfare Awards South 

Prabhu was nominated six times at the Filmfare Awards South

Tamil Nadu State Film Awards

References

External links
Official website

Indian male film actors
Tamil male actors
Living people
1956 births
Male actors from Chennai
Film producers from Chennai
Tamil film producers
Loyola College, Chennai alumni
Bishop Cotton Boys' School alumni
Male actors in Tamil cinema
Male actors in Telugu cinema
Male actors in Kannada cinema
Male actors in Malayalam cinema
Tamil Nadu State Film Awards winners
20th-century Indian male actors
21st-century Indian male actors